Hal Dixon may refer to:

 Hal Dixon (biochemist) (1928–2008), Henry Dixon, Irish biochemist
 Hal Dixon (umpire) (1920–1966), American baseball umpire

See also 
 Henry Dixon (disambiguation)
Harold Dixon (disambiguation)